Sean Blakemore (born August 10, 1967) is an American actor who is portraying Shawn Butler on the ABC daytime drama General Hospital, a role he began playing on January 21, 2011 on a recurring basis. Blakemore was nominated for a Daytime Emmy Award for Outstanding Supporting Actor in a Drama Series for his role on General Hospital in 2012 and won the award in 2016. On April 6, 2011, he signed a contract with ABC to continue his role full-time.

Early life
Blakemore was born on August 10, 1967, the fifth of seven children (five girls and two boys) from a single parent household, in St. Louis, Missouri. He has one brother, Ronnell, and five sisters, Kim, Sharon, Yvonne, Yvette, and Rechelle.

He attended Hazelwood East High School in his hometown of St. Louis. Blakemore was a successful model, then moved to Los Angeles on July 19, 1998, to become an actor.

Career
Blakemore has appeared on episodes on such series as ER, Monk, The Shield, Cold Case, NCIS and Bones.  He won Auds honors at the Hollywood Black Film Festival for his portrayal of Ric Jackson in the independent romantic drama Big Ain't Bad.

Blakemore also appeared in the 2002 film Dahmer, and TV movies Motives 2: Retribution, and Blackout.

In 2011, Blakemore joined the cast of General Hospital in the role of Shawn Butler. In 2015, he exited the role; he later reprised the role for guest appearances in November 2015 and April 2016. Blakemore returned to the role in April 2021.

Personal life
Blakemore married Nadyia Jones on June 19, 2010. In late March 2013, it was announced that the couple were having their first baby. In May 2013, the Blakemores had a daughter.

Filmography

Film

Television

Awards and nominations

References

External links

"Interview with Sean Blakemore", Screenplayers

1967 births
Living people
American male film actors
Male actors from St. Louis
American male soap opera actors
African-American male actors
American male television actors
Daytime Emmy Award winners
Daytime Emmy Award for Outstanding Supporting Actor in a Drama Series winners
21st-century African-American people
20th-century African-American people